Dioryctria simplicella is a moth of the family Pyralidae. It is known from Europe, except the southern parts.

The wingspan is 21–30 mm. Adults are on wing from July to September in one generation per year.

References

Moths described in 1863
simplicella
Moths of Europe